Hollywood is a song by Australian folk duo Angus & Julia Stone. It was released in November 2008 as the fourth and final single from their debut studio album, A Book Like This. It features "Hollywood" and three re-recorded songs from that album. "All the Colours" and "Johnny and June" are new versions of "Wasted" and "Hollywood", respectively, with Angus singing. "Lonely Hands" is Julia's version of "Just a Boy".

All three re-done versions appear on Red Berries, the 2010 bonus disc for Down the Way.

Track listing 
 "Hollywood"
 "All The Colours"
 "Johnny and June"
 "Lonely Hands"

References

2007 songs
2008 singles
Angus & Julia Stone songs
Songs written by Julia Stone